The 2021 British Champions Series, sponsored by QIPCO, was the 11th edition of the horse racing series comprising 35 of the UK's top flat races.

The series began with the 2,000 Guineas at Newmarket on 1 May, and ended on British Champions Day at Ascot on 16 October.

Results

The series was split into five categories: Sprint, Mile, Middle Distance, Long Distance and Fillies & Mares. Each category included seven races.

Sprint

Mile

Middle Distance

Long Distance

Fillies & Mares

Notes

See also
2021 Breeders' Cup Challenge series
2021 Epsom Derby

References

External links
 Official website

British Champions Series
British Champions Series
British Champions Series
British Champions Series
British Champions Series
British Champions Series
British Champions Series
British Champions Series
British Champions Series